The Chambers Road Covered Bridge near Olive Green, Ohio was built in 1874 by Everett S. Sherman.  It was listed on the National Register of Historic Places in 1974.  It is an extremely rare surviving example of a Childs Truss bridge.

References

Covered bridges on the National Register of Historic Places in Ohio
Bridges completed in 1874
Buildings and structures in Delaware County, Ohio
National Register of Historic Places in Delaware County, Ohio
1874 establishments in Ohio
Road bridges on the National Register of Historic Places in Ohio
Wooden bridges in Ohio
Truss bridges in the United States